The 2019–20 Egyptian Premier League, also known as The WE League for sponsorship purposes, is the 61st season of the Egyptian Premier League, the top Egyptian professional league for association football clubs, since its establishment in 1948. The season began on 21 September 2019 and will conclude on 31 October 2020. Fixtures for the 2019–20 season were announced on 12 September 2019.

Defending champions Al Ahly won their 5th consecutive and 42nd overall Egyptian Premier League title on 18 September 2020, following Zamalek's 1–0 defeat against Aswan.

On 14 March 2020, a decision was made by the Egyptian Football Association to postpone all football activities in Egypt due to the spread of the COVID-19 pandemic in the country. The initial suspension, until 29 March, was then extended multiple times until at least mid-July. On 2 July 2020, the EFA announced that the league would recommence on 6 August, and confirmed that all clubs' players and staff will be tested for COVID-19 before resuming training.

Overview

VAR introduction
In August 2019, Egyptian Football Association acting-president Amr El Ganainy revealed the intentions to implement the video assistant referee (VAR) technology in the Egyptian Premier League starting from the second half of the 2019–20 season; stating that this would be a huge step forward for Egyptian football. Three months later, the EFA started a four-month training programme headed by EFA head of referees committee Gamal El Ghandour and Egyptian international referee Gehad Grisha for Egyptian referees to prepare them for the VAR introduction.

In late January 2020, the EFA received final IFAB approval for VAR usage in the domestic competitions after fulfilling all the necessary requirements to introduce VAR technology into Egyptian football. By the end of the training programmes held by the EFA, El Ghandour announced that 52 new Egyptian referee have received a VAR license; describing it as a "miracle" to have from 4 to 56 licensed referee in just four months.

The VAR technology was officially introduced in the Egyptian Premier League on 5 March 2020 in a match between Tala'ea El Gaish and ENPPI at Gehaz El Reyada Stadium.

Effects of the COVID-19 pandemic 
After the first case of COVID-19 was identified in Egypt on 14 February 2020, the Egyptian Football Association revealed that there is no intentions to postpone football activities in Egypt and instead they announced a series of precautionary measures to be used by all clubs' players and staff. By the arrival of the first COVID-19 case in Egypt, the league was paused for the mid-season break.

On 10 March 2020, the EFA decided to continue the league behind closed doors until further notice to avoid the spreading of the disease. However, after the number of infected people in Egypt reached 110 cases just four days later of the initial announcement, the EFA decided to suspend all football activities in Egypt until at least 29 March 2020.

Resumption
On 1 July 2020, Zamalek refused to resume training or return to complete the season due to the COVID-19 pandemic in the country unless a "cure" for coronavirus is found, this came after the club's goalkeeper Mohammed Awad revealed he had tested positive for COVID-19 on 26 June. Football activities were due to return on 25 July after the government allowed teams to resume training in June

Nevertheless, the EFA announced on 3 July 2020 that the season would commence on 6 August 2020 after almost five months of being suspended due to the COVID-19 pandemic, the season would commence its schedule in two phases starting with the postponed games according to the head of Competitions Committee Hossam El Zanati.

The first phase will include the games scheduled to be played from 6 August until the end of the month, while the second phase of the games are scheduled to be played starting from 1 September until the end of the season. These will be revealed when the EFA reaches a final agreement concerning the Aswan Stadium as the venue for matches after clubs rejected Aswan Stadium located south of Cairo, as the proposed location for matches to be played citing the distance and long journey for the players and after CAF decides the final dates for the Champions League and CAF Confederation Cup semi-finals and finals.

The EFA in June had implemented safety guidelines and testing procedures for players mandating two tests with five days separating each test, since then 19 tests have returned positive with individuals in isolation.

Teams

Eighteen teams will compete in the league - the top fifteen teams from the previous season, and three teams promoted from the Egyptian Second Division.

Teams promoted to the Egyptian Premier League
The first team to be promoted was Aswan from Group A, as they secured the promotion to the Egyptian Premier League following their 2–1 away win against Al Nasr Lel Taa'den on 4 April 2019. The club managed to return to the Egyptian Premier League after staying two seasons in the Egyptian Second Division, and will play in the top flight for the tenth time in their history.

The second team to be promoted was Tanta from Group C, as they sealed the promotion to the Egyptian Premier League following their 2–0 away win against Sidi Salem on 11 April 2019. The club returned to the Egyptian Premier League after spending only one season in the Egyptian Second Division, as they were relegated from the Egyptian Premier League during the 2017–18 season. This season will mark the fifteenth appearance for Tanta in the Egyptian Premier League.

The third team to be promoted was FC Masr from Group B, as they earned the promotion to the Egyptian Premier League following their 0–0 away draw with Al Merreikh on 18 April 2019. The club earned the promotion after an intense contents with 4 other clubs for the only promotion spot from their group. FC Masr will play in the Egyptian Premier League for the first time in the club's history.

Teams relegated to the Egyptian Second Division
The first club to be relegated was Nogoom, who suffered an immediate return to the Egyptian Second Division following a 2–1 away defeat to Misr Lel Makkasa on 10 May 2019. Despite defeating Zamalek 1–0 earlier in the previous season and having a great start, the club started slowly to collapse which eventually made them finish in the last place.

The second club to be relegated was El Dakhleya, who were relegated from the Egyptian Premier League for the first time in their history following a 2–1 home defeat to Zamalek on 12 May 2019; ending their stay in the league that lasted for eight years. El Dakhleya were one of eight clubs that are not founding members of the Egyptian Premier League and have never been relegated since their debut in the top flight.

The third club to be relegated was Suez-based side Petrojet, who were also relegated from the Egyptian Premier League for the first time in their history following a 0–0 draw with Al Mokawloon Al Arab on 3 June 2019; ending their top flight spell of thirteen years. Similar to El Dakhleya, Petrojet were one of eight clubs that are not founding members of the Egyptian Premier League and have never been relegated since their debut in the top flight.

Venues

Notes

Personnel and kits

1. On the back of shirt.
2. On the sleeves.
 WE, Oppo, El Kasrawy Group, SAIB Bank, EgyptAir and GLC Paints are the league's main sponsors, and their logos are printed on most teams' kits.
 Referee kits are made by Puma.

Managerial changes

Foreign players
Clubs can have a maximum of four foreign players registered during the season. Clubs cannot sign foreign players unless these players have played in the first or second tier in their countries. Clubs also cannot sign any foreign goalkeepers. In addition, each club can register a player from Palestine, Syria, or the UNAF region; those players are not counted as foreign players. Also, any foreign player who holds Egyptian nationality is not considered a foreign player and will be registered as a local player. For example, Al Masry's player Mahmoud Wadi of Palestine holds both Palestinan and Egyptian nationalities, and as a result he is not registered as a foreign player.

Players name followed with  indicates the player is playing out on loan.
Players name followed with § indicates the player is playing for the club on loan.
Players name in bold indicates the player is registered during the mid-season transfer window.
Players name in ITALICS indicates the player has left the club during the mid-season transfer window.

Results

League table

Positions by round
The table lists the positions of teams after each week of matches. In order to preserve chronological evolvements, any postponed matches are not included in the round at which they were originally scheduled, but added to the full round they were played immediately afterwards. For example, if a match is scheduled for matchday 13, but then postponed and played between days 16 and 17, it will be added to the standings for day 16.
 

Source: Soccerway

Results table

Notes

Season statistics

Scoring
First goal of the season: Seifeddine Jaziri for Al Mokawloon Al Arab against Tala'ea El Gaish (21 September 2019)

Top scorers

Notes

Hat-tricks

Note
(H) – Home ; (A) – Away

Top assists

Clean sheets

Discipline

Player
Most yellow cards: 11
 Amr El Sisi (Tala'ea El Gaish)
Most red cards: 2
 Emeka Eze (Al Masry)
 Tarek Hamed (Zamalek)
 Solomon Mensah (Aswan)
 Ahmed Said Ouka (FC Masr)
 Ramy Rabia (Al Ahly)
 Islam Saleh (FC Masr)
 Ferjani Sassi (Zamalek)
 Mohamed Abdel Razek (Tala'ea El Gaish)

Club
Most yellow cards: 75
Tala'ea El Gaish
Most red cards: 8
Al Mokawloon Al Arab

Number of teams by governorate

References

1
 
Egyptian Premier League
Egypt
Association football events postponed due to the COVID-19 pandemic